Lhotse may refer to:
 Lhotse, the fourth highest mountain in the world located in Nepal and Tibet
 Lhotse Shar, a subsidiary mountain of Lhotse
 Lhotse Middle, a subsidiary peak to Lhotse
 Lhotse Shar Glacier, a glacier of the Himalayas in the Solukhumbu District of Nepal